Sulo Richard Bärlund (15 April 1910 – 13 April 1986) was a Finnish shot putter who won a silver medal at the 1936 Summer Olympics. At the European Championships he finished fourth in 1938 and sixth in 1946.

References

1910 births
1986 deaths
People from Kangasala
People from Häme Province (Grand Duchy of Finland)
Athletes (track and field) at the 1936 Summer Olympics
Olympic athletes of Finland
Olympic silver medalists for Finland
Finnish male shot putters
Medalists at the 1936 Summer Olympics
Olympic silver medalists in athletics (track and field)
Sportspeople from Pirkanmaa
20th-century Finnish people